Ruaan Stephen Lerm (born 25 March 1992) is a South African rugby union player for the  in the Pro14. His regular position is number eight or flanker.

Career

Youth

Lerm played schools rugby for Hoërskool Dr. E.G. Jansen in Boksburg, which earned him call-ups to a few youth week tournaments for his local  side. In 2008, he was selected in their squad for the Under-16 Grant Khomo Week in Ermelo, which also led to his inclusion in a South African Under-16 Elite squad training group. He then represented the Falcons in two consecutive Under-18 Craven Week competitions; the 2009 competition held in East London and the 2010 competition held in Welkom, where he scored a try in his only appearance against Border.

In 2011, Lerm made the short move from the Falcons to Johannesburg-based . Lerm played in all fourteen of the 's matches during the 2011 Under-19 Provincial Championship, scoring five tries as they went all the way to final of the competition. Lerm played all 70 minutes as his side ran out 20–19 winners to clinch the championship in front of their home crown in Johannesburg.

Lerm moved up to the Under-21 age group in 2012 and made ten appearances for the  side in the 2012 Under-21 Provincial Championship (scoring two tries) and then made eleven starts during the 2013 Under-21 Provincial Championship, scoring five tries.

Golden Lions

His first class debut came in 2012, during the Vodacom Cup competition. After playing off the bench in the Golden Lions' 59–29 victory over his former side  in their next match, he then started a further five matches during the competition.

In the 2014 Vodacom Cup, he started in all nine matches of the ' season as they made it all the way to the final, only to lose 30–6 in the final against  in Kimberley.

Griquas

In 2014, Lerm made a loan move to Kimberley to join  for the duration of the 2014 Currie Cup Premier Division, as part of the deal that saw Howard Mnisi in the opposite direction.

References

South African rugby union players
Living people
1992 births
People from Kempton Park, Gauteng
Rugby union flankers
Rugby union number eights
Golden Lions players
Griquas (rugby union) players
Southern Kings players
Rugby union players from Gauteng
Lions (United Rugby Championship) players